Gottlieb (Georg) Nathanael Bonwetsch (5 February 1848 – 18 July 1925) was a Russian-born German Protestant theologian.

He was born in Norka, Saratov province in Russia, where his father was pastor. He studied theology in Dorpat, then later in Göttingen and Bonn. In 1878 he published a treatise on the writings of Tertullian, titled Die Schriften Tertullians, nach der Zeit ihrer Abfassung untersucht. In 1881 obtained his doctorate in theology and his first academic position was at Dorpat (1882). He became a full professor of church history at the University of Göttingen in 1891.

His main area of work was the history of dogma involving the Early Christian Church. He also made contributions to the critical edition and commentary on the works of Methodius of Olympus and Hippolytus of Rome.

References

 HathiTrust Digital Library published works.

1848 births
1925 deaths
19th-century German Protestant theologians
20th-century German Protestant theologians
Academic staff of the University of Göttingen
Academic staff of the University of Tartu
19th-century German male writers
19th-century German writers
German male non-fiction writers
Members of the Göttingen Academy of Sciences and Humanities